Lejay may refer to:

Places
Lejay, Afghanistan
site of 2003 Lejay firefight
Base école Général Lejay, military base at Le Luc – Le Cannet Airport

People
French family name, including:
Guy Michel Lejay (1588–1674), French advocate at the French parliament, compiler of Lejay's Polyglott Bible
Paul Lejay (1861–1920), Latinist, member of Académie des Inscriptions et Belles-Lettres.
:fr:Pierre Lejay (1898–1958), French Jesuit and physician
Jim LeJay in 1977 NFL Draft for Louis Cardinals

Others
Lejay, a French brand of crème de cassis